Perieți is a commune located in Ialomița County, Muntenia, Romania. It is composed of five villages: Fundata, Misleanu, Păltinișu, Perieți and Stejaru.

References

Communes in Ialomița County
Localities in Muntenia